The Combined Counties Football League is a regional men's football league in south-eastern England with members in Berkshire, Buckinghamshire, Hampshire, Hertfordshire, Jersey, Kent, Middlesex, Oxfordshire, Surrey, and the western half and south-eastern quarter of Greater London, featuring a number of professional clubs. It is sponsored by Cherry Red Records and is officially known as the Cherry Red Records Combined Counties Football League.

It was founded in 1922 as the Surrey Senior League and was renamed in 1978 to the Combined Counties League. Initially, the league was a single division, but it consists now of 61 teams in three divisions: Premier Division North, Premier Division South and Division One. The league also has six teams competing in an Under-23 Development Division, known as the John Bennett Development Division, and eighteen Under-18 teams split across North and South divisions, known as the Tony Ford Under-18 Youth Divisions.

The Premier Divisions North and South are two of sixteen recognised leagues to form the ninth level of the English football league system (known as Step 5 of the National League System), and Division One is one of seventeen recognised leagues at level 10 (known as Step 6 of the National League System). The Combined Counties Football League is a feeder to the Isthmian League and the Southern League.

History
The league was renamed on 18 June 1978 when the Surrey Senior League underwent a metamorphosis to try to attract clubs from outside the county. The expanded league was initially called the Home Counties League but there was an objection to the title from the Home Counties Conference, which forced the league to change its name.

The league had a verbal agreement with the Surrey County Football Association to revert to a similar title to the former league – the Surrey Senior Football League. However, this name was later rejected as the Surrey County Football Association intended to reform the Surrey Senior League at a later date. It was first suggested by the FA that the league should be called the Corinthian Football League, but this was frowned upon by the Athenian Football League within which the old Corinthian Football League was incorporated. The alternative suggestion, the Combined Counties Football League, was approved for the 1979–80 season.

With increasing numbers for the 1981–82 season, the clubs were split into two equal divisions: the Eastern Division and the Western Division. The winners then met in a two-legged play-off final, with Ash United winning 3–0 in aggregate against Malden Town. The league reverted to a single division for the 1982–83 season.

The league began with nine founder-member clubs and continued to steadily grow, resulting in the league becoming a feeder to the Isthmian League in 1984 with 16–18 teams usually competing in the Combined Counties Football League. Southwick became the first team promoted to the Isthmian League from a feeder club in 1985, and Chertsey Town followed a year later.

In 1987, the league announced a four-year sponsorship agreement with Dan-Air worth a five figure sum. As part of the agreement, the league became known as the Dan-Air Football League and a representative team was introduced. The Dan-Air Class Elite Cup was also launched in 1989.

The Dan-Air Youth League was formed for the 1991–92 season and opened to youth teams from all member clubs. However, the league attracted just seven clubs for the inaugural season and reluctantly abandoned the competition after one year. With the Dan-Air sponsorship coming to an end at the end of the season, the league agreed a sponsorship deal with Parasol Professional Portrait Photography and became known as the Parasol Combined Counties Football League. The League Challenge Cup became known as the Parasol Challenge Cup, and the Dan-Air Class Elite Cup was replaced by the Frazer Freight Vase with sponsorship from Frazer Freight International.

Ahead of the 1997–98 season, the league received further sponsorship and subsequently became known as the Courage Combined Counties Football League. In 2002, the league reached a membership of 24 clubs – most notably with the addition of AFC Wimbledon. The introduction of AFC Wimbledon proved invaluable for the league's other clubs. With crowds of up to 4,000 spectators for their home clubs, many clubs would break their attendance records when AFC Wimbledon visited their ground which could generate substantial matchday revenue. The club's first matches in the league also required large numbers of police to control crowds, including mounted police and patrolling helicopters.

In 2002, the league began a three-year sponsorship agreement to become the Seagrave Haulage Combined Counties Football League, although Seagrave pulled out of the deal after one season.

Following the National League System Conference in July 2002, the Combined Counties Football League and the Surrey County Senior League entered into discussions. This resulted in the two leagues merging for the 2003–04 season, forming a league with 40 clubs that would operate across the fourth and fifth steps of non-league football with a Premier Division and Division One.

Another new sponsorship for the 2005–06 season, this time with Cherry Red Records, saw the league become known as the Cherry Red Records Combined Counties Football League.

In 2011, the league accepted the membership of newly-founded club Guernsey. The arrival of the team meant that clubs would fly or take a ferry over to the Channel Islands in order to fulfil their fixtures, with Guernsey covering the expenses as part of their membership. Backed by former England international Matt Le Tissier, who made a one-off appearance in the Combined Counties Football League in 2013, they won the Combined Counties Football League Division One and Combined Counties Premier Challenge Cup in their first season.

In May 2018, Westfield and premier division runners up, Bedfont Sports, were promoted to the Bostik (Isthmian) Football League due to The FA's decision to restructure steps 3 and 4 of the National League System. It was the first time that two teams had been promoted in one season.

The 2019–20 season was abandoned as a result of the COVID-19 pandemic in England. The pandemic led to further disruptions in the 2020-21 season, with it starting in September, before being suspended in December and eventually curtailed in February 2021 by restrictions from COVID-19 lockdowns. The FA later announced on 12 April that the Combined Counties League would administer a new Step 5 division from 2021–22 after another scheduled NLS restructuring had a one-season postponement due to the pandemic.

Promotion rules and cups
Its rules allow up to three teams to be promoted and relegated between either Premier division and Division One; promotion is dependent on the clubs finishing in the top three of Division One each having the correct ground-grading. 
Division One is "fed" by the county leagues at level 11, the former Step 7 of the National League System, such as the Surrey Elite Intermediate League, the Middlesex County League and the Thames Valley Premier Football League.

The League organises three cups. 
The Premier Challenge Cup is competed for by the teams in all three divisions. 
The Division One Cup is competed for by teams exclusively in Division One.
The Grant McLellan Youth Cup is competed for by current and ex-member clubs who have teams playing in the under-18 age group in other leagues.

The Southern Combination Challenge Cup has been labelled "a supplementary Combined Counties League Cup" and includes some clubs in the Isthmian League and other leagues.

Member teams 2022–23

Premier Division North
 Ascot United
 Broadfields United
 Burnham
 Chalfont St Peter
 Edgware & Kingsbury
 Egham Town
 Flackwell Heath
 Harefield United
 Hilltop
 Holyport
 London Lions
 North Greenford United
 Oxhey Jets
 Reading City
 Spelthorne Sports
 Virginia Water
 Wallingford & Crowmarsh
 Wembley
 Windsor
 Wokingham & Emmbrook

Premier Division South
 Abbey Rangers
 AFC Croydon Athletic
 Alton
 Badshot Lea
 Balham
 Banstead Athletic
 Camberley Town
 Cobham
 Colliers Wood United
 Farnham Town
 Fleet Town
 Frimley Green
 Guildford City
 Horley Town
 Jersey Bulls
 Knaphill
 Raynes Park Vale
 Redhill
 Sheerwater
 Tadley Calleva

Division One
 AFC Aldermaston
 AFC Hayes
 Bagshot
 Bedfont & Feltham
 Berks County
 British Airways
 CB Hounslow United
 Cove
 Eversley & California
 FC Deportivo Galicia
 Hillingdon Borough
 Kensington & Ealing Borough
 Langley
 London Samurai Rovers
 Molesey
 Penn & Tylers Green
 Rayners Lane
 Sandhurst Town
 Spartans Youth
 Westside
 Woodley United

Sponsors
The league has had a succession of title sponsors. Cherry Red Records are the current League and Premier Challenge Cup sponsors and have been since 2005.

List of champions
For the 1978–79 season the league was known as the Home Counties League.

For the 1981–82 season the league expanded to two divisions.

For the 1982–83 season the league reverted to a single division.

For the 2003–04 season Division One was added formed mainly of clubs from the Surrey County Senior League.

For the 2021–22 season the Premier Division expanded to two divisions.

Notes and references
Notes on location where name is not one town

References

External links
Official site
Official Twitter site
The FA Full-Time – League Page

 
1978 establishments in England
9
Sports leagues established in 1978